Sultan Mohammad Dost (born 10 May 1932 in Kabul) is a former Afghanistan wrestler, who competed at the 1960 Summer Olympics in the welterweight freestyle event.

References

External links

Wrestlers at the 1960 Summer Olympics
Afghan male sport wrestlers
Olympic wrestlers of Afghanistan
Sportspeople from Kabul
1932 births
Living people
20th-century Afghan people